Idvor is a village in northern Serbia. It is located in the Kovačica municipality, South Banat District, Vojvodina province. The village has a Serb ethnic majority (93.98%) and its population numbers 1,198 people (2002 census).

Name
In Serbian, the village is known as Idvor (Идвор), in German as Idwor, and in Hungarian as Torontáludvar. The town's name originates from Hyd Var, which means "Guard near border crossing" in Hungarian.

Geography

It is situated near the Tamiš river in the Banat region of Serbia.

History
During Ottoman rule (in 1660/66), Idvor was populated by ethnic Serbs. Another wave of Serbs came to the town near the end of the 17th century during the second of the Great Migrations, led by Arsenije IV Jovanović Šakabenta. Until 1795, the village was situated at location known as "Staro selo", and in that year it was moved to its current position.

Historical population
1961: 1,823
1971: 1,621
1981: 1,442
1991: 1,308
2002: 1,198

Notable residents
Serbian physicist and physical chemist Mihajlo Pupin was born in Idvor.

References
Slobodan Ćurčić, Broj stanovnika Vojvodine, Novi Sad, 1996.
Jovan Erdeljanović, Srbi u Banatu, Novi Sad, 1992.
Dr. Dušan J. Popović, Srbi u Vojvodini, knjiga 1, Novi Sad, 1990.

See also
List of places in Serbia
List of cities, towns and villages in Vojvodina

Populated places in South Banat District
Populated places in Serbian Banat
Kovačica